Major Claude Scudamore Jarvis CMG OBE (20 July 1879 – 8 December 1953) was a British colonial governor. As an Arabist and naturalist, he became noted for his knowledge of the desert Bedouin and for his rapport with them.

Life and career
The son of John Bradford Jarvis, an insurance clerk, and his wife, Mary Harvey, he joined the merchant navy in 1896, then volunteered for British imperial service in the Second Boer War in 1899. Following his return from the war, he was in April 1902 appointed a second lieutenant in the 3rd (Militia) Battalion of the Dorsetshire Regiment.

He married Mabel Jane Hodson, daughter of a member of the US embassy staff in London, in 1903. They had one daughter. Jarvis then combined part-time military service in Ireland with freelance journalism until the First World War broke out.

Jarvis's interest in Arabs and the Arabic language grew from wartime army service in Palestine and Egypt, then a British protectorate. He was seconded to the new Egyptian frontiers administration by the British high commissioner, Sir Reginald Wingate, serving first in the Western desert and then in Sinai. His Arabic and knowledge of Bedouin customs allowed him as governor of Sinai from 1923 to intercede successfully in local disputes and to clamp down on banditry and drug trafficking. He also traced the remains of a Roman and Byzantine settlement in northern Sinai, and by damming the local Wadi Gedeirat and restoring the stone channels succeeded in recreating an oasis. He wrote of governance in Western Egypt:

The Coastguards had policed the Western Desert and Red Sea District; and the [Ministry of the] Interior had functioned in the oases of Kharga, Dakhla, Bahariya, and Farafra; whilst the Ministries of Justice, Finance, Health, Education, etc., had all supplied officials to perform their various duties. 

In 1933 Governor of Sinai Jarvis was appointed an Officer of the Order of the British Empire. The King of Egypt had early in 1931 awarded him with the Insignia of the Third Class of the Order of the Nile.

Jarvis took early retirement in 1936 and was appointed a Companion of the Order of St Michael and St George (CMG). He then devoted himself to natural history, writing and farming. He joined the staff of the magazine Country Life in 1939, contributing a column, A Countryman's Notes, for 14 years. He was awarded the Lawrence Medal by the Royal Central Asian Society in 1938. He died at his Ringwood home, Chele Orchard, on 8 December 1953.

Partial bibliography

Further reading

 Duggan, Brian Patrick (2009). Saluki: The Desert Hound and the English Travelers Who Brought it to the West. Jefferson, NC: McFarland, pp. 191–203.  (an account of Jarvis's life and career up to 1936)

References

1879 births
1953 deaths
British colonial governors and administrators in Africa
English writers
English male journalists
Companions of the Order of St Michael and St George
Officers of the Order of the British Empire
Dorset Regiment officers
Country Life (magazine) people
Military personnel from Essex
British Army personnel of World War I
British Army personnel of the Second Boer War